Rose Creek is a tributary of the Stanislaus River in Tuolumne County, California in the United States.

See also
List of rivers of California

References

Rivers of Tuolumne County, California
Stanislaus River